Parambrata Chatterjee is an Indian film actor, director, producer, and television personality. He has a significant following in West Bengal, India. Parambrata started his career with Bengali television and films. He made his Hindi debut in Kahaani (2012), starring along with Vidya Balan. He also acted in Bhalo Theko (2003), which is Vidya Balan's debut film. He has a very good knowledge of world music and has sung for few Bengali films like Chaya Manush and Samantaral.

He has acted in many television series, tele-films, short films and features. His directorial debut feature film is Jiyo Kaka, starring Rituparna Sengupta and Rudranil Ghosh. His second directorial venture was Hawa Bodol. Seven months after the success of Kahaani, he was signed by Jeffrey D. Brown, who won an Academy Award for his debut short film in 1986, for his film Sold.

As Director and Co-Producer

As actor

Web series

References

External links
 

Indian filmographies
Male actor filmographies